On location can refer to:

Location shooting
Filming location, a place where a movie is filmed, separate from a sound stage or studio back lot
On Location (TV series), an HBO stand-up comedy series
On Location Vacations, an American media company and blog covering filming locations and filming news
Adobe OnLocation, computer software for recording directly to a disk